John Richard Motta (born September 3, 1931) is an American former basketball coach whose career in the National Basketball Association (NBA) spanned 25 years. Motta coached the Washington Bullets to the 1978 NBA Championship, and he won the 1971 NBA Coach of the Year Award with the Chicago Bulls. Motta is eighth all-time with 1,952 games as coach, while ranking 13th in wins and fourth in losses; he has the most wins of eligible coaches not currently inducted into the Basketball Hall of Fame. In 25 seasons as a coach, he reached the postseason fourteen times.

Known as a strict disciplinarian with high expectations for his players, Motta developed a reputation for putting together well-conditioned, tough, physical teams. He was known for his eccentric personality and fiery temper, which included infamously throwing his jacket at a referee, kicking a basketball into the stands and throwing a dollar bill onto the court and demanding it to play after a GM traded one of his players for cash considerations. He retired from coaching in 1997 and ran a bed and breakfast with his wife in Bear Lake, Idaho.

Early coaching career
After graduating from Utah State University in Logan, Motta started coaching at Grace High School in Grace, Idaho, where he taught seventh grade and coached for two years before being drafted in the armed services, then returned. He once said in an interview that winning the state championship (AA) at Grace in 1959 was his greatest thrill as a coach, even topping the NBA championship he won two decades later.

Motta coached at Weber State in Ogden, Utah. Under the direction of Motta and assistant coach Phil Johnson, Weber State won three Big Sky Conference championships (1965, 1966, 1968)

NBA coaching career

Chicago Bulls (1968–1976)
Motta was hired as head coach of the Chicago Bulls in 1968 after a six-year stint at Weber State. He replaced Johnny Kerr, who had led the team to two playoff appearances despite subpar records of 33-48 and 29-53, respectively. Motta coached the team for eight seasons, coaching 656 games.  From 1970 to 1974 he led the Bulls to four consecutive 50 win seasons, winning the NBA Coach of the Year Award in 1971. However this did not translate to playoff success as the Bulls won just one playoff series (1974) in that span. However, they advanced to the Conference Finals in the 1974-75 season, beating the Kansas City Kings to play the Golden State Warriors, losing in 7 games. The team went an NBA-worst 24–58 in 1975–76. He was eventually replaced by Ed Badger on August 25, 1976.

Washington Bullets (1976–1980)
Motta had two years left on his contract with the Bulls who allowed him to negotiate with the Washington Bullets. He left the Bulls to succeed K. C. Jones in a similar capacity with the Bullets on May 28, 1976. In his first season, the Bullets went 48-34 while advancing to the Semifinals again after beating the Cavaliers in the First Round, although they lost to the Houston Rockets in six games. The next year was the pinnacle for the team and Motta's career. They went 44-38, but they advanced all the way to the 1978 NBA Finals, where they beat the Seattle SuperSonics in seven games to win the NBA championship. The following year, the team went 54-28 while winning the Atlantic Division. This was not only their sixth division title in eight years, it was also their last division title until 2017. The Bullets went to the 1979 NBA Finals, although they had to fight the full seven games in both the Semifinals and the Conference Finals, nearly blowing a 3-1 series lead to the Atlanta Hawks in the semifinals and having to come back from a 3-1 series deficit from the San Antonio Spurs in the conference finals. In the Finals that year, they played the Seattle SuperSonics once again. The Bullets won Game 1 at home 99–97, but the SuperSonics won the following four games to win the NBA championship. The following year, the Bullets went 39-43, although they qualified for a playoff berth. They were beaten by the Philadelphia 76ers in two games. He resigned as head coach on May 27, 1980 despite having one year left on his contract. He had an agreement to honor that remaining year by joining the Bullets front office as a special consultant to general manager Bob Ferry if he didn't get any head coaching appointments from other teams. He was succeeded by Gene Shue.

"The opera isn't over 'til the fat lady sings!"
Motta is sometimes erroneously credited with coining the celebrated phrase: The opera ain't over 'til the fat lady sings. In fact, the first recorded use of the phrase was by Texas Tech sports information director Ralph Carpenter, as reported in the Dallas Morning News on 10 March 1976.

During a KENS-TV broadcast of the 1978 NBA Eastern Conference semi-finals between the Washington Bullets and the San Antonio Spurs, KENS Sports anchor Dan Cook used the phrase in an attempt to encourage Spurs fans, as their team was down three games to one against the Bullets. Motta heard the broadcast and adopted his own rendition of the expression — "The 'opera' isn't over 'til the fat lady sings" — to warn Bullets fans against braggadocio.

The odds were against the underdog Bullets, and sportswriters were forecasting a grim finale, so Motta rebounded with the upbeat ostinato, "Wait for the fat lady!"  The Bullets won the Eastern Conference against the Atlantic Division Champion Philadelphia 76ers, and went on to beat the Western Conference Champion Seattle SuperSonics four games to three for the 1978 NBA title.

The victory gave Washington, D.C. fans their first professional championship team in any sport since the Washington Redskins won the NFL title in 1942.  (In Motta's second year as coach, the Bullets had become only the third team to win the NBA championship in a seventh game on the road).  That 1978 championship remains the franchise's only NBA championship.

After the climactic Game 7 victory to claim the title, Motta celebrated with his team wearing a beer-soaked The Opera Isn't Over 'Til The Fat Lady Sings T-shirt.

What made the championship so great was that we weren’t supposed to win it. We came a long way. Most people didn’t give us a chance, but I felt all along we could. I really did.

— Dick Motta 

In a Nov. 5, 2003 interview in the Utah Statesman, the student newspaper of his alma mater Utah State University, Motta said opera lovers were angry with him at first. "My wife said they were going to kill me when I said that." But that as time passed, Motta said, he was extended friendly invitations to a variety of events with "operatic" themes ranging from the Metropolitan Opera in New York to the Grand Ole Opry in Nashville.

Dallas Mavericks (1980–1987)
Motta was the first head coach of the Dallas Mavericks, hired by the team on July 16, 1980. His first team went 15-67, dead last in the league. They did not lose as many games again until 1992 when they lost 60 games. Motta's Mavericks gradually rose up in prominence, rising in finishes in the Midwest Division from 6th in the first season to 4th by the third year. His fourth season (1983-84) was the start of something big for the team, as they went 43-39 while qualifying for the playoffs for the first time. They defeated the Seattle SuperSonics in the First Round to advance to the Semifinals, where they lost to the Los Angeles Lakers in five games. The following year, the Mavs went to the playoffs once again after a 44-38 season, although they lost to the Portland Trail Blazers in the First Round. They went to the Semifinals the following year after a 44-38 year and defeating the Utah Jazz in the First Round, although it ended with another loss to the Lakers. The next season was Motta's last, and it was his best with the team as they went 55-27 and finished 2nd in the Western Conference, winning their first Midwest Division title (the Mavericks did not win a division title again for twenty seasons). However, they lost to the SuperSonics in the First Round in four games. Motta resigned on May 20.

Sacramento Kings (1990–91)
On January 4, 1990, Motta was hired by the Sacramento Kings in the middle of the season, replacing Jerry Reynolds, who had led the team to a 7-21 record. Motta coached the Kings to a 16-38 record, finishing with a 23-59. The next season, the Kings went 25-57 while finishing dead last in the Pacific Division. After a 7-18 start, Motta was fired on Christmas Eve in 1991.

Dallas Mavericks (1994–1996)
On May 17, 1994, Dallas hired him back as coach of the team, replacing Quinn Buckner, who went 13-69. Motta led the team to a 23 game improvement with a 36-46 record. His second and final season went less successful as they went 26-56. He was reassigned from his head coach role on May 1, 1996.

Denver Nuggets (1996–97)
The Denver Nuggets hired Motta on November 26, 1996, replacing Bernie Bickerstaff, who had gotten off to a 4-9 start. The Nuggets went into a tailspin, going 17-52 while losing 26 of their final 30 games to finish 21-61 and 12th in the Western Conference. Motta was fired on April 21, 1997.

Head coaching record

|-
| align="left" |Chicago
| align="left" |
|82||33||49||.402|| align="center" |5th in West||—||—||—||—
| align="center" |Missed Playoffs
|- 
| align="left" |Chicago
| align="left" |
|82||39||43||.476|| align="center" |3rd in West||5||1||4||.200
| align="center" |Lost in Division Semifinals
|-
| align="left" |Chicago
| align="left" |
|82||51||31||.622|| align="center" |2nd in Midwest||7||3||4||.429
| align="center" |Lost in Conf. Semifinals
|-
| align="left" |Chicago
| align="left" |
|82||57||25||.695|| align="center" |2nd in Midwest||4||0||4||.000
| align="center" |Lost in Conf. Semifinals
|-
| align="left" |Chicago
| align="left" |
|82||51||31||.622|| align="center" |2nd in Midwest||7||3||4||.429
| align="center" |Lost in Conf. Semifinals
|-
| align="left" |Chicago
| align="left" |
|82||54||28||.659|| align="center" |2nd in Midwest||11||4||7||.364
| align="center" |Lost in Conf. Finals
|-
| align="left" |Chicago
| align="left" |
|82||47||35||.573|| align="center" |1st in Midwest||13||7||6||.538
| align="center" |Lost in Conf. Finals
|-
| align="left" |Chicago
| align="left" |
|82||24||58||.293|| align="center" |4th in Midwest||—||—||—||—
| align="center" |Missed Playoffs
|-
| align="left" |Washington
| align="left" |
|82||48||34||.585|| align="center" |2nd in Central||9||4||5||.444
| align="center" |Lost in Conf. Semifinals
|- ! style="background:#FDE910;"
| align="left" |Washington
| align="left" |
|82||44||38||.537|| align="center" |2nd in Central||21||14||7||.667
| align="center" |Won NBA Championship
|-
| align="left" |Washington
| align="left" |
|82||54||28||.659|| align="center" |1st in Atlantic||19||9||10||.474
| align="center" |Lost in NBA Finals
|-
| align="left" |Washington
| align="left" |
|82||39||43||.476|| align="center" |3rd in Atlantic||2||0||2||.000
| align="center" |Lost in First Round
|-
| align="left" |Dallas
| align="left" |
|82||15||67||.183|| align="center" |6th in Midwest||—||—||—||—
| align="center" |Missed Playoffs
|-
| align="left" |Dallas
| align="left" |
|82||28||54||.341|| align="center" |5th in Midwest||—||—||—||—
| align="center" |Missed Playoffs
|-
| align="left" |Dallas
| align="left" |
|82||38||44||.463|| align="center" |4th in Midwest||—||—||—||—
| align="center" |Missed Playoffs
|-
| align="left" |Dallas
| align="left" |
|82||43||39||.524|| align="center" |2nd in Midwest||10||4||6||.400
| align="center" |Lost in Conf. Semifinals
|-
| align="left" |Dallas
| align="left" |
|82||44||38||.537|| align="center" |3rd in Midwest||4||1||3||.250
| align="center" |Lost in First Round
|-
| align="left" |Dallas
| align="left" |
|82||44||38||.537|| align="center" |3rd in Midwest||10||5||5||.500
| align="center" |Lost in Conf. Semifinals
|-
| align="left" |Dallas
| align="left" |
|82||55||27||.671|| align="center" |1st in Midwest||4||1||3||.250
| align="center" |Lost in First Round
|-
| align="left" |Sacramento
| align="left" |
|54||16||38||.296|| align="center" |7th in Pacific||—||—||—||—
| align="center" |Missed Playoffs
|-
| align="left" |Sacramento
| align="left" |
|82||25||57||.305|| align="center" |7th in Pacific||—||—||—||—
| align="center" |Missed Playoffs
|-
| align="left" |Sacramento
| align="left" |
|25||7||18||.280|| align="center" |(fired)||—||—||—||—
| align="center" |—
|-
| align="left" |Dallas
| align="left" |
|82||36||46||.439|| align="center" |5th in Midwest||—||—||—||—
| align="center" |Missed Playoffs
|-
| align="left" |Dallas
| align="left" |
|82||26||56||.317|| align="center" |5th in Midwest||—||—||—||—
| align="center" |Missed Playoffs
|-
| align="left" |Denver
| align="left" |
|69||17||52||.246|| align="center" |5th in Midwest||—||—||—||—
| align="center" |Missed Playoffs
|-class="sortbottom"
| align="left" |Career
| ||1,952||935||1,017||.479|| ||126||56||70||.444

Personal life
After being fired by the Denver Nuggets, Motta retired from coaching. He returned to his native Utah, where he and his wife Jan opened a bed and breakfast, The Bluebird Inn, at Bear Lake on the border of Utah and Idaho.

References

Bibliography

 Dyani Gordon. "When Washington Went to the Opera"
 NBA Encyclopedia. "'Fat Lady' Sings Victorious Tune for Bullets"

1931 births
Living people
American men's basketball coaches
Basketball coaches from Utah
Chicago Bulls head coaches
Dallas Mavericks head coaches
Denver Nuggets head coaches
Detroit Pistons announcers
High school basketball coaches in the United States
American people of Italian descent
Junior college men's basketball coaches in the United States
National Basketball Association championship-winning head coaches
People from Midvale, Utah
Sacramento Kings head coaches
Utah State University alumni
Washington Bullets head coaches
Weber State Wildcats men's basketball coaches